City of Wolverhampton Council is the governing body of the city of Wolverhampton, England.  It was previously known as Wolverhampton Metropolitan Borough Council (WMBC) prior to the award of city status in 2000, and also as Wolverhampton City Council before adopting the "City of Wolverhampton" branding in 2015.

Organisation
The council offices are at the Civic Centre, which is located in St. Peter's Square in the city centre.

The Labour Party currently controls the council and have been in majority on the council since 1974, with the exceptions of 1978–1979, 1987, 1992–1994 and 2008–2010.  The leader of the council is Ian Brookfield. The deputy leader is Stephen Simkins after Louise Miles lost her Oxley seat to the Conservatives at the Local Elections in 2021. The council has a Leader and Cabinet model of executive arrangements, with each Cabinet Member having political responsibility for assigned service areas. The council has a total of 60 Councillors (currently 44 Labour and 16 Conservative).

Tim Johnson serves as the council's Chief Executive Officer and chairs the Authority's Strategic Executive Board of Directors comprising Mark Taylor (Deputy Chief Executive Officer), David Pattison (Director of Governance, Monitoring Officer and Solicitor to the City Council), Emma Bennett (Director of Children's Services, including Education provision) and Claire Nye (Director of Finance and Section 151 Officer).

At the Local Government's prestigious Municipal Journal National Awards in 2017, the council won Local Authority of the Year, Most Improved Local Authority of the Year, Leadership Team of the Year and Governance & Scrutiny Team of the Year.

Other key achievements in 2017 included the council's Children's Services being rated as "Good" following an OFSTED inspection, the council has been accredited with "Achieving" status for its commitment to equality & diversity following a Local Government Association peer assessment and the council's Mayoralty team was awarded "Civic Team of the Year" by the National Association of Civic Officers.

The council's housing stock is managed by Wolverhampton Homes.

Council affiliation

Wards
There are 20 wards of City of Wolverhampton Council:

A map showing the ward boundaries is available.

History

Wolverhampton gained the beginnings of modern local government in 1777, when the Wolverhampton Improvement Act was passed by Parliament. This allowed for the establishment of 125 Town Commissioners who undertook a variety of local improvement work such as punishing bear baiting, improving drainage, widening streets and by the end of the century street lighting had been provided at every street corner and over the doorway of every inn, and water supply had been improved by the sinking of ten new wells and the provision of a great water tank in the market place. Policing had been improved with the appointment of ten watchmen and attempts were also made to regulate the markets and inspect hazardous food.

Wolverhampton was incorporated as a municipal borough in 1848 under the Municipal Corporations Act 1835 and the first meeting of the council, consisting of 12 Aldermen and 36 Councillors, was held on 22 May 1848. The town was then made a County Borough in 1889 under the Local Government Act 1888.

In 1933, the boundaries of the borough expanded, taking in areas from Cannock Rural District and Seisdon Rural District, with very little of the surrounding urban area being affected, with only Heath Town Urban District being abolished.

The bulk of the urban districts of Bilston (a borough itself after 1933), Tettenhall and Wednesfield were added to the borough in 1966, along with the northern section of the urban district of Coseley and parts from the north of Sedgley and the west of Willenhall.  The vast majority of these areas were traditionally part of the Parish of Wolverhampton, and were part of the original Parliamentary Borough.

Wolverhampton had no further changes made to its boundaries during the 1974 reorganisation of local government, the borough already having a population larger than the 250,000 required for education authorities. This contrasted with both the Redcliffe-Maud Report, and the initial White Paper for the 1974 reforms where large areas of the present South Staffordshire district were to be added to the borough. During the 1974 reforms it was placed within the West Midlands Metropolitan County.

Coat of arms

The coat of arms of Wolverhampton was granted on 31 December 1898, on the occasion of the 50th anniversary of the foundation of the council.

The various symbols within the arms are representative of the history of the city. The book represents the education within the city, specifically the 16th century Wolverhampton Grammar School; the woolpack represents the mediaeval woollen trade within the city; the column is a representation of the Saxon pillar that can be found within the churchyard of St. Peter's Collegiate Church in the city centre; whilst the keys are representative of the church itself and its dedication to St. Peter. The padlock represents one of the major industries of the area at the time of the granting of the arms – that of lock-making; whilst the brazier at the top is indicative of the general metal-working industries in the area. The cross is ascribed to King Edgar.

The motto on the coat of arms is 'Out of Darkness Cometh Light'.

Prior to 1898 there was a former coat of arms that had been in use since 1848, though these arms were never officially granted.

References 

Council
Local authorities in the West Midlands (county)
Metropolitan district councils of England